Jonathan Philbin Bowman (6 January 1969 – 3 March 2000) was an Irish journalist and radio broadcaster.

Early life and education
Born in Dublin in 1969, Jonathan Philbin Bowman, the son of the historian and broadcaster John Bowman, was educated at Sandford Park School and at Newpark Comprehensive School in Dublin. He chose to leave formal education in his early teens, a decision he announced to the nation on RTÉ's flagship talk programme The Late Late Show.

Career
Bowman worked mostly as a freelance journalist. He co-presented a radio show The Rude Awakening on Dublin's FM104 with Scott Williams, George Hellis and Margaret Callanan for two years between 1993 and 1994 before joining the Sunday Independent newspaper as a columnist. He later presented television programmes on RTÉ, such as the quiz show Dodge the Question.

Death
Bowman died in a fall at his home on Fitzgerald Street in Harold's Cross, Dublin, on 3 March 2000. Tribute was paid to him to by the then Taoiseach Bertie Ahern. Bowman was survived by his parents, his sister Emma, his brothers Abie and Daniel and his only son Saul Philbin Bowman (Saul Mehigan)

References

1969 births
2000 deaths
FM104 presenters
Irish columnists
People from County Dublin
RTÉ television presenters
Sunday Independent (Ireland) people